Pike Creek Valley is a census-designated place in New Castle County, Delaware, United States. Its population was 11,217 as of the 2010 census.

Education 
Most of Pike Creek Valley is in the Christina School District while some is in the Red Clay Consolidated School District.

The portion in the Christina district is zoned to Etta J. Wilson Elementary School, Shue/Medill Middle School, and Newark High School.  Grades 5-6 were previously assigned to Bancroft Intermediate School in Wilmington.

Zoned elementary schools of the Red Clay section include Heritage Elementary School, and Linden Hill Elementary School. All of Pike Creek Valley in Red Clay is zoned to Skyline Middle School. Most of Pike Creek Valley in Red Clay is zoned to John Dickinson High School, and a very small segment coincides with McKean High School.

Demographics

References

Census-designated places in New Castle County, Delaware
Census-designated places in Delaware